Beistegui Hermanos S.A. (BH) is a Spanish bicycle manufacturer. The company was founded in 1909 to produce firearms and in 1919, after World War I, BH began making bicycles. Prior to the Spanish Civil War, Beistegui Hermanos also produced firearms, specifically copies of the Ruby pistol (as the 1914 Model) and Mauser C96 (as the MM31 and MM34).
 
BH is in Vitoria-Gasteiz, capital of the Basque Country, Spain. During the 1960s, the main BH factory in Vitoria manufactured not just frames, but everything from saddle to spokes and handlebar. Today, BH has two manufacturing and assembly facilities in Vitoria and another one in Águeda, Portugal. The facilities include CNC laser machining, which also produces fitness equipment and parts for BMW and Mercedes-Benz.

In the early 1990s, BH purchased Peugeot and founded Cycleurope. Cycleurope owns Bianchi, Peugeot and Gitane. In 1996, BH sold Cycleurope to concentrate on home markets of Spain and in Portugal. In 2001, it re-focused on the pan-European market.

BH manufactures 200,000 bicycles a year, 50% of which are exported to European countries other than Spain.

BH sponsored the Direct Énergie Pro Cycling Team in the 2016 and 2017 seasons, and currently sponsors the Spanish team Burgos BH.

See also

 List of electric bicycle brands and manufacturers
 Outline of cycling
 Beistegui

References

External links 

 BH website
 BH USA website
 BH Canadian Distributor website
 BH BIKES ASIA website
 BH Asia website

Firearm manufacturers of Spain
Cycle manufacturers of Spain
Defunct firearms manufacturers
Basque companies
Cycle types
Bicycle
Electric bicycles
History of cycling
Micromobility
Electric
Road cycles
Defunct manufacturing companies of Spain
Mountain bike manufacturers